Gary Hart (born 1936) is an American politician.

Gary Hart or Garry Hart may also refer to:

 Gary Hart (wrestler) (1942–2008), American professional wrestler and wrestling manager
 Gary Hart (footballer) (born 1976), British footballer
 Gary K. Hart (1943–2022), American politician
 Gary Hart, British citizen who caused the Great Heck rail crash by falling asleep while driving on the M62 motorway
 Garry Hart, Baron Hart of Chilton (19402017), British Labour politician